Balbharati (The Maharashtra State Bureau of Textbook Production and Curriculum Research) is located in Pune, Maharashtra, India.

The Institute
The institute was established by the Government of Maharashtra on 27 January 1967. This was as per the recommendations of the Kothari Commission. This is to improve the quality of textbooks for Stds. I to VIII, and to make textbooks available at a reasonable price. Balbharati institute is an autonomous body registered under the Public Trusts Act 1950 and the Societies Registration Act, 1860.

The Editorial Team
The editorial team consists of following members:
 Vijaya Wad
 Gajanan Chawhan
 H G Narlawar
 Rajeev Tambe
 Dilip Phaltankar
 Shrikant Chougule
 Madhav Rajguru

Online books
Since students are not getting textbooks even after schools start, Balbharati put up soft copies of all its textbooks on its website, from where they can be easily downloaded. The e books from first to eighth standard are downloadable from the website of Balbharti. Currently the books are available in eight languages — Marathi, English, Hindi, Urdu, Kannada, Telugu, Sindhi and Gujarati. 35 books titled My District for Std III Geography for each district in the state are available on the website. Balbharati would also be publishing the STD XI and XII new syllabus from 2019-20 and 2020-21

References

External links
 

Book publishing companies of India
Education in Maharashtra
Organisations based in Pune
State agencies of Maharashtra
Government agencies established in 1967
1967 establishments in Maharashtra
Publishing companies established in 1867